Sir John Mills' Moving Memories is a British documentary film featuring 16mm color home movies shot by the actor Sir John Mills. It documents his life between 1946 and 1969, directed and edited by Marcus Dillistone and produced by his son Jonathan Mills. Commentary was provided by Sir John (who was over 90 years old at the time), Hayley Mills, Juliet Mills and Sir Richard Attenborough. His wife Mary Hayley Bell is also seen towards the end of the film listening to her husband singing at the piano. The scene was later to be screened in full when Sir John appeared on the Parkinson chat show.

The home movie clips date mainly from the 1950 and early 1960s and include appearances by Dirk Bogarde, David Niven, Laurence Olivier, James Mason, Lionel Jeffries, Rex Harrison, Walt Disney, Jean Simmons, Harry Andrews, Tyrone Power and Stewart Granger. Some of the color footage was shot on the sets of black and white movies such as Ice-Cold in Alex (1958) and Dunkirk (1958).  Marcus, who also edited the film, spent many hours matching Sir John's home movie location clips to the finished scenes in these movies.

Jonathan said "I immediately realised what could be made using these home movies – a unique way of telling my father's extraordinary life story."

The film was broadcast by the BBC in its Christmas schedule.

In 2002 the film was released on DVD and VHS video by ITV Studios Home Entertainment.

References

External links
 
 Sir John Mills' Moving Memories. Glory Film Co.

BBC television documentaries
Documentary films about actors
British television documentaries
2000 television specials
British television films